Shingle Springs (formerly, Shingle Spring and Shingle) is a census-designated place (CDP) in El Dorado County, California, United States. The population was 4,432 at the 2010 census, up from 2,643 at the 2000 census.

Shingle Springs is part of the Sacramento–Arden-Arcade–Roseville Metropolitan Statistical Area.

The Shingle Springs Band of Miwok Indians, a federally recognized tribe of Maidu and Miwok people, are headquartered in Shingle Springs.

History
Before the area was settled by Anglo-Americans, a Maidu village called Bamom was located in the vicinity.

Like many of the other towns in California's Mother Lode, Shingle Springs grew on the site of a mining camp set up by gold miners during the California Gold Rush, in this case a group of "49ers" who had followed the Carson-Emigrant Trail through Pleasant Valley, Nevada. It took its name from a horse-drawn shingle machine capable of producing 16,000 shingles a day that was located near the springs at the western edge of the camp. The Boston-Newton Joint Stock Association, which left Boston April 16, 1849, camped there the night before their arrival at Sutter's Fort on September 27, after a remarkable journey across the continent. A rich store of written records preserved by these pioneers has left a detailed picture of the Gold Rush. As a result, the town is now designated California Historical Landmark #456.

The Shingle Spring post office operated from 1853 to 1855. The Shingle Springs post office opened in 1865, the name was changed to Shingle in 1895, and reverted in 1955.

Geography

Demographics

The 2010 United States Census reported that Shingle Springs had a population of 4,432. The racial makeup of Shingle Springs was 3,919 (88.4%) White, 14 (0.3%) African American, 108 (2.4%) Native American, 50 (1.1%) Asian, 3 (0.1%) Pacific Islander, 132 (3.0%) from other races, and 206 (4.6%) from two or more races. Hispanic or Latino of any race were 469 persons (10.6%).

The Census reported that 4,344 people (98.0% of the population) lived in households, 88 (2.0%) lived in non-institutionalized group quarters, and 0 (0%) were institutionalized.

There were 1,627 households, out of which 527 (32.4%) had children under the age of 18 living in them, 1,015 (62.4%) were opposite-sex married couples living together, 163 (10.0%) had a female householder with no husband present, 73 (4.5%) had a male householder with no wife present.  There were 76 (4.7%) unmarried opposite-sex partnerships, and 12 (0.7%) same-sex married couples or partnerships. 291 households (17.9%) were made up of individuals, and 104 (6.4%) had someone living alone who was 65 years of age or older. The average household size was 2.67.  There were 1,251 families (76.9% of all households); the average family size was 3.01.

The population was spread out, with 1,031 people (23.3%) under the age of 18, 334 people (7.5%) aged 18 to 24, 874 people (19.7%) aged 25 to 44, 1,568 people (35.4%) aged 45 to 64, and 625 people (14.1%) who were 65 years of age or older.  The median age was 44.6 years. For every 100 females, there were 97.7 males.  For every 100 females age 18 and over, there were 96.4 males.

The homeowner vacancy rate was 1.2%; the rental vacancy rate was 5.2%.  3,343 people (75.4% of the population) lived in owner-occupied housing units and 1,001 people (22.6%) lived in rental housing units.

Politics

Local Schools

 Buckeye Elementary School
 California Montessori Project
 Pleasant Grove Middle School
 Ponderosa High School
 Latrobe Elementary School
 Miller's Hill Middle School
 Rescue Elementary School

Climate
The Köppen Climate Classification subtype for this climate is "Csa" (Mediterranean Climate).

References

Census-designated places in El Dorado County, California
California Historical Landmarks
Mining communities of the California Gold Rush
Populated places established in 1849
1849 establishments in California
Census-designated places in California